Kibos is a neighborhood in the city of Kisumu, the third largest city in Kenya, and the second largest city, after Kampala, Uganda, in the Lake Victoria basin.

Location

The geographical coordinates of Kibos, Kenya are 0°04'08.0"S, 34°48'55.0"E (Latitude:-0.068889; Longitude:34.815278).

Geography
The neighborhood is traversed by the Kibos River, which passes through the settlement in a general north-to-south direction.

Transport
It is served by a railway station along the Kisumu branchline of the national railway system.

The economy
The neighborhood is zoned as an industrial distinct. It hosts the offices and factories of Kibos Sugar and Allied Industries Limited, a privately-owned sugar manufacturer. The factory manufactures both white and brown sugar, molasses, ethanol and paper. An attached 18 MW co-generation power station uses bagasse as raw material. The industrial complex employs in excess of 1,000 direct employees.

Th neighborhood is also the location of Kisumu Solar Power Station. The 40 MW, ground-mounted solar farm is under development by American and Canadian investors. When commercially commissioned as expected in 2023, the power generated will be sold to Kenya Power and Lighting Company, for integration into the national electricity grid.

See also
 Railway stations in Kenya
 List of sugar manufacturers in Kenya

References 

Populated places in Kenya
Kisumu
Kisumu County